The Mampalli copper plate (974 AD), also romanised as Mamballi, records a donation from the chiefly family of Venad, present-day Kerala, to the Chengannur Temple. The inscription is the earliest epigraphical record to mention the Kollam Era (Kollan-Tonri Era, 149).

The record is engraved on both sides of a single copper plate in Vattezhuthu with Grantha characters in an early form of Malayalam language. The plate was originally owned by Mampalli Madhom, near Trivandrum (now at Padmanabhapuram Museum).

A second plate, companion to the first one and ascribed approximately to the same date, is owned by Mampalli Madhom.

Contents 
The Mampalli record is notable for containing two royal deeds by the chiefly family of Venad.

(a) First deed (as an attipperu) 
A meeting of Srivallavan Kotai, the chieftain (the utaiya) of Venad, with the committee of Brahmin village elders of Chengannur (Tiruchenkunrur Parutai Perumakkal) at Panainkavil palace, Kollam.

Srivallavan Kotai donated the sole proprietary rights of the deity (the pattaraka) of the Ayirur Temple, installed by Tirukkalaiyapuram Aditya Umayamma (Tirukkalaiyapurattu Atichan Umaiyammai), and the land assigned to the Ayirur deity (the landed property of the Ayirur Temple) to Tirukkalaiyapuram Aditya Umayamma.

(b) Second deed (as a kizhitu) 
Aditya Umayamma in turn donated what she received— the proprietary rights and the landed property of the Ayirur Temple — to Chengannur Temple as a subordinate property (kizhitu) with provision for the routine expenditure and the payment of protection fee (rakshabhoga) to the village assembly secretaries (potuvals).

The village assembly secretaries (potuvals) were to protect the Ayirur Temple and its property and receive 200 para (a unit of measure) of paddy per year as protection fee (rakshabhoga). Fine is prescribed — those who violated the agreement by obstructing cultivation or confiscating property in the kizhitu, and their accomplices, were to pay 200 kalanju (a unit of measure) of gold as fine.

Witnesses to the transaction 
The following witnesses are recorded:
 Murunkaiyur Tevan Pavittiran
 Itaiyamanam Cankaran Kandan
 Manalmukku Kantan Tomataran
 Punalur Iravi Parantavan
 Kutakottur Parantavan Kandan

Scribe = Chattan Chataiyan, the secretary (potuval) of Chengannur.

References 

Vatteluttu
Malayalam inscriptions
Kerala history inscriptions